Scott Tunkin (born 15 June 1974 in Sydney, Australia) is an Australian baseball player. He represented Australia at the 1996 Summer Olympics.

References

1974 births
Olympic baseball players of Australia
Australian baseball players
Baseball players at the 1996 Summer Olympics
Living people
Baseball players from Sydney